Wágner da Conceição Martins (born May 19, 1978), better known as Zuluzinho, is a Brazilian vale tudo fighter and mixed martial artist. He is the son of Vale Tudo legend Casemiro Nascimento Martins ("Rei Zulu"). Wagner was raised by his grandmother and works as a security guard in a number of reggae clubs in northern Brazil. Following in his father's footsteps, he trained in both Brazilian jiu-jitsu and vale tudo. Zuluzinho holds a purple belt in Brazilian jiu-jitsu under black belt Ricardo "Ricardinho Bulldog" Candido Gomes, who also serves as his MMA coach.

Record controversy
Zuluzinho reportedly compiled an undefeated Vale Tudo record of 38-0 (38 knockouts) in Brazil prior to his fight at Cage Warriors Strike Force 2 in England. However, all but five of those fights are unconfirmed. In the December 2005 issue of Full-Contact Fighter, Marcelo Alfonso wrote that Zuluzinho started his MMA career in 2000 in the town of Teresina, near the city of Sao Luis, Brazil.

Career highlights

Zuluzinho was beaten after only 26 seconds of the first round in PRIDE Fighting Championships Shockwave 2005 event at the hands of world champion Fedor Emelianenko.

In the Pride Open Weight Grand Prix on May 5, 2006, he was defeated via armbar in the first round by Antônio Rodrigo Nogueira.

His next fight was a loss against Eric Esch at PRIDE 34 by Submission (kimura).

On December 31, 2007, Zuluzinho scored the biggest win of his career by stopping Ikuhisa "The Punk" Minowa in 3 rounds at K-1 in Japan.

He saw his winning streak snapped when he lost by 1st-round TKO to Ibragim Magomedov at FightForce - Russia vs. The World on April 19, 2008.

On July 7, 2008, Zuluzinho was knocked out by fellow super heavyweight Guigao Guigao at DDG-Desafio de Gigantes 10. In the semi-final match, Zuluzinho's 63-year-old father, Rei Zulu, lost by a disqualification to Santos Samurai.

Zulu faced rising star Geronimo "Mondragon" dos Santos on December 14, 2008. In this bout he landed a flurry of strikes early in the first round but was unable to finish dos Santos, and subsequently was knocked out in round 2.

One year later he returned to action with a win against Brazilian Top Team veteran Angelo Araujo.

On Nov. 30, 2010, Zuluzinho lost in his second bout against Geronimo dos Santos via first-round KO at Mr. Cage 4.

On June 2, 2018, Zuluzinho lost to Edvaldo de Oliveira via TKO at Imortal FC 9.

On February 23, 2021, Zuluzinho faced undefeated Russian Yusup Shuaev at AMC Fight Nights: Sochi. Despite dropping his opponent at the very end of a round and celebrating prematurely his win, Zuluzinho would go on to lose the bout via majority decision.

Mixed martial arts record

|-
|Loss
|align=center|14–12 (1)
|Serigne Ousmane Dia
|TKO (punches)
|MMA Attack 4: #Comback
|
|align=center| 1
|align=center| 0:42
|Będzin, Poland
|
|-
|-
|Loss
|align=center|14–11 (1)
|Petr Romankevich
|KO (knee)
|AMC Fight Nights 114
|
|align=center| 1
|align=center| 4:53
|Minsk, Belarus
|
|-
|-
|Loss
|align=center|14–10 (1)
|Yusup Shuaev
|Decision (majority)
|AMC Fight Nights: Sochi
|
|align=center| 3
|align=center| 5:00
|Sochi, Russia
|
|-
| Win
| align=center| 14–9 (1)
| Aleksandar Aleksic
| TKO (punches)
| Megdan Fighting 6
| 
| align=center| 1
| align=center| 3:18
| Belgrade, Serbia
|
|-
| Win
| align=center| 13–9 (1)
| Marko Djordevic
| TKO (punches)
| Megdan Fighting 5
| 
| align=center| 1
| align=center| 0:53
| Sremska Mitrovica
| 
|-
| Win
| align=center| 12–9 (1)
| Aleksandar Aleksic
| TKO (punches)
| Megdan Fighting 4
| 
| align=center| 1
| align=center| 0:23
| Novi Sad, Serbia
| 
|-
| Loss
| align=center| 11–9 (1)
| Edvaldo de Oliveira
| TKO (retirement)
| Imortal FC 9
| 
| align=center| 1
| align=center| 5:00
| Sao Luis, Brazil
| 
|-
| Loss
| align=center| 11–8 (1)
| Geronimo dos Santos
| KO (punches)
| Mr. Cage 4
| 
| align=center| 1
| align=center| N/A
| Manaus, Brazil
| 
|-
| Win
| align=center| 11–7 (1)
| Douglas Humberto
| Decision (split)
| Ilha Combat 3: Confrontation of Giants 
| 
| align=center| 3
| align=center| 5:00
| Sao Luis, Brazil
| 
|-
| Win
| align=center| 10–7 (1)
| Angelo Araujo
| TKO (retirement)
| Ilha Combat 2: Araujo vs. Zuluzinho
| 
| align=center| 2
| align=center| 5:00
| Sao Luis, Brazil
| 
|-
| Loss
| align=center| 9–7 (1)
| Geronimo dos Santos
| KO (punch)
| Fusion Combat
| 
| align=center| 2
| align=center| 0:22
| Boa Vista, Roraima, Brazil
| 
|-
| Loss
| align=center| 9–6 (1)
| Guilherme dos Anjos
| TKO (submission to punches)
| Desafio de Gigantes 10 
| 
| align=center| 1
| align=center| 3:52
| Macapa, Brazil
| 
|-
| Loss
| align=center| 9–5 (1)
| Ibragim Magomedov
| TKO (punches)
| fightFORCE: Russia vs. The World
| 
| align=center| 1
| align=center| N/A
| St. Petersburg, Russia
| 
|-
| Win
| align=center| 9–4 (1)
| Ikuhisa Minowa
| TKO (corner stoppage)
| K-1 Premium 2007 Dynamite!!
| 
| align=center| 3
| align=center| 2:13
| Osaka, Japan
| 
|-
| Win
| align=center| 8–4 (1)
| Vladimir Kuchenko
| Submission (rear-naked choke)
| Bodog Fight: USA vs. Russia   
| 
| align=center| 1
| align=center| 2:14
| Moscow, Russia
| 
|-
| Loss
| align=center| 7–4 (1)
| Guilherme dos Anjos
| TKO (retirement)
| Desafio de Gigantes 8
| 
| align=center| 2
| align=center| 3:50
| Macapa, Brazil
| 
|-
| Loss
| align=center| 7–3 (1)
| Butterbean
| Submission (americana)
| PRIDE 34
| 
| align=center| 1
| align=center| 2:35
| Saitama, Japan
| 
|-
| Loss
| align=center| 7–2 (1)
| Antônio Rodrigo Nogueira
| Submission (armbar)
| Pride FC - Total Elimination Absolute
| 
| align=center| 1
| align=center| 2:17
| Osaka, Japan
| 
|-
| Loss
| align=center| 7–1 (1)
| Fedor Emelianenko
| TKO (submission to punches)
| Pride FC: Shockwave 2005 
| 
| align=center| 1
| align=center| 0:26
| Saitama, Japan
| 
|-
| Win
| align=center| 7–0 (1)
| Henry Miller
| TKO (knees)
| Pride 30: Fully Loaded
| 
| align=center| 1
| align=center| 1:31
| Saitama, Japan
| 
|-
| Win
| align=center| 6–0 (1)
| Rafal Dabrowski
| KO (punch)
| CWFC: Strike Force 2
| 
| align=center| 2
| align=center| 2:04
| Coventry, England
| 
|-
| NC
| align=center| 5–0 (1)
| Kleber Ranieri Jansen
| NC (both fighters fell from ring)
| Desafio de Gigantes 4
| 
| align=center| 1
| align=center| N/A
| Macapa, Brazil
| 
|-
| Win
| align=center| 5–0
| Fabio Black
| KO (strikes)
| World Combat 3
| 
| align=center| 1
| align=center| 1:20
| Sao Luis, Brazil
| 
|-
| Win
| align=center| 4–0
| Junior Pitbull
| TKO (punches) 
| Desafio de Gigantes 2 
| 
| align=center| 1
| align=center| 0:37
| Macapa, Brazil
| 
|-
| Win
| align=center| 3–0
| James Adler
| KO (punches)
| Main Event Vale Tudo
| 2004
| align=center| 1
| align=center| N/A
| Itapeua, Brazil
| 
|-
| Win
| align=center| 2–0
| James Adler
| KO (punches)
| Main Event Vale Tudo
| 2004
| align=center| 1
| align=center| N/A
| Itapeua, Brazil
| 
|-
| Win
| align=center| 1–0
| Carlos Andino
| KO (punches)
| Main Event Vale Tudo
| November 4, 2003
| align=center| 1
| align=center| N/A
| Itapeua, Brazil
|

References

Brazilian male mixed martial artists
Super heavyweight mixed martial artists
Mixed martial artists utilizing Brazilian jiu-jitsu
Brazilian practitioners of Brazilian jiu-jitsu
1978 births
Living people
People from São Luís, Maranhão
Sportspeople from Maranhão